Samson Oghenewegba Nathaniel (born 29 August 1997) is a Nigerian athlete. He competed in the mixed 4 × 400 metres relay event at the 2020 Summer Olympics.

References

External links
 

1997 births
Living people
Nigerian male sprinters
Athletes (track and field) at the 2020 Summer Olympics
Olympic athletes of Nigeria
Place of birth missing (living people)
African Games medalists in athletics (track and field)
Athletes (track and field) at the 2019 African Games
African Games bronze medalists for Nigeria
20th-century Nigerian people
21st-century Nigerian people